"Remember When" is a song by the American heavy metal band Bad Wolves. It was their third single off of their debut album Disobey. It topped the Billboard Mainstream Rock chart for two weeks in 2019.

Background
The song was first released on Bad Wolves' debut studio album Disobey in May 2018. A music video was released a month later on June 15, debuting exclusively on Apple Music. The song was released to radio in January 2019, and spent 24 weeks on the Billboard Mainstream Rock Songs chart, eventually topping it for a week in July 2019.

Themes and composition
Lyrically, the song deals with the relationship between frontman Tommy Vext and his identical twin brother; while Vext chose a life of sobriety and pursued a career in the music industry as a singer, his brother became a drug dealer and struggled with addiction and substance abuse. Specifically, the song was inspired by the fact that his brother attempted to murder Vext. Vext explained: 

While AntiHero Magazine described the original song as heavy metal, a separate acoustic version was released in February 2019.

Personnel
Band
 Tommy Vext – lead vocals
 Doc Coyle – lead guitar, backing vocals
 Chris Cain – rhythm guitar
 Kyle Konkiel – bass, backing vocals
 John Boecklin – drums

Production
 Kane Churko – mixing, mastering

Charts

Weekly charts

Year-end charts

References

2019 singles
2019 songs
Bad Wolves songs
Songs written by Drew Fulk
Eleven Seven Label Group singles